Roger Henri Kamiel, Knight Raveel (15 July 1921 – 30 January 2013) was a Belgian painter, whose work is often associated with pop art because of its depiction of everyday objects. Raveel's style evolved throughout his career, from abstract to figurative.

Raveel was born in Machelen-aan-de-Leie, Belgium, and trained in the academies of Ghent and Deinze. After 1952 he began to use large white spaces. A central theme in his work was the opposition of fiction and reality. In 1976 he created a large wall painting in the Brussels metro station Mérode. Portraits of his first wife and favourite model Zulma, to whom he was married until her death in 2009, were a running motif throughout his work.

Raveel died on 30 January 2013 in Deinze, at the age of 91. On 15 July 2016, Google Doodle commemorated his 95th birthday.

Works

References

External links 

 some works of Roger Raveel
 Raveel at Arts Paradise
 Raveel at Galerie Dessers
 official website of the Roger Raveel Museum
 images of paintings and drawings by Roger Raveel, on Wikiart
 'Roger Raveel en zijn keuze uit het Museum voor Schone Kunsten in Gent', texts in Dutch of Ludo Bekkers and Roger Raveel; in Dutch art-magazine 'Openbaar Kunstbezit', Jan/Maart 1975
 biography facts and dates of Roger Raveel, in the Dutch R.K.D. Archive, The hague

1921 births
2013 deaths
Belgian painters
Belgian nobility
People from Zulte